This is a list of episodes for the second season (1987–88) of the television series Married... with Children.

At the beginning of this season, Kelly is portrayed as a girl of reasonable intelligence (though she is often teased by Bud for her promiscuity and bleached hair). By the end, however, her character obtains her trademark stupidity that will become both a plot device and comic focus for the rest of the series. This season also contains the first use of the "Bundy Cheer" and the first instance of the Bundys leaving Chicago to go on vacation. Although Buck is portrayed in later seasons as having been with the Bundys since he was a pup, it's implied by Peg that they've had him for only three years and Al states that he's actually Bud's pet; he even "speaks" once ("Buck Can Do It"), something that becomes a regular feature beginning in the fourth season. Michael Faustino (David's younger brother), makes the first of five guest appearances during the course of the series.

Divine, actor, singer and drag queen, was scheduled to tape a guest appearance on March 7, 1988 as Uncle Otto in the second season wrap-up episode "All in the Family". After spending all the previous day at Sunset Gower Studios for rehearsals, Divine returned to his hotel that evening, where he dined with friends at the hotel restaurant before returning to his room. Shortly before midnight, he died in his sleep, at age 42, of an enlarged heart. In the event, Divine's role was played by James 'Gypsy' Haake and the credits ended with "This episode is dedicated to the memory of Divine 1945-1988".

Amanda Bearse, Christina Applegate and David Garrison each missed two episodes this season.

Episodes

References

Sources
 
 

1987 American television seasons
1988 American television seasons
02